Tourism in Rwanda is the largest source of foreign exchange earnings in Rwanda and was projected to grow at a rate of 25% every year from 2013-18. The sector is the biggest contributor to the national export strategy. Total revenues generated from the sector in 2014 alone was USD 305 millions. The sector has also attracted direct foreign investments with major international hotel brands setting up shop in the country including Marriot Hotels & Resorts, Radisson Blu, Park Inn by Radisson, Sheraton Hotels and Resorts, Protea Hotels by Marriott, Golden Tulip Hotels, and Zinc. With its new world-class convention center Rwanda is set to become a regional and international conference hub owing to ever improving conference facilities, an excellent and expanding transportation network, and straightforward immigration procedures such as the ability for online visa applications, visa-at-gate policy for all Africans, and a one tourist visa policy for the EAC.

Tourism in Rwanda is rapidly increasing. To further place Rwanda on the world map as a first-class tourism destination, the Rwanda Development Board (RDB) signed a three-year partnership deal with London-based association football team, Arsenal Football Club, and a two-year partnership with French association football Giant Paris Saint-Germain F.C. to help build the country's tourism industry. This has lifted overall tourism numbers by 8% according to Rwandan officials.

Wildlife tourism 

Rwanda, being located in East Africa, has extensive natural beauty. Tour groups are led by an experienced guide who specialises in teaching others about the landscape and wildlife of Rwanda. Expeditions visit volcanoes, waterfalls, and rainforests that are home to many different African animals.

Rwanda is home to a huge diverse population of animals including mountain gorillas and the world's largest natural park for hippos with some 20,000 are believed to live there. Although Rwanda is still a developing country, it has quite a few hotels and its new international interest in tourism is helping economic growth.

Plastic bags are banned in Rwanda, and tourists are instructed not to bring them to the country.

Attractions

Volcanoes National Park 

Volcanoes National Park, part of the larger multinational Virunga Conservation Area, is a stop center for all Rwandan gorilla safaris and shelters many mountain gorillas. Being a roughly two-hour drive from the Kigali International Airport makes it the most accessible gorilla national park in the world. Sharing a border with Uganda and the Democratic Republic of the Congo, this national park in Rwanda is home to a growing number of critically endangered mountain gorillas. Experts estimate that there are about 600 gorillas in the park, which is a significant increase from around 240-250 individuals in 1981. Besides gorillas, Volcanoes National park is a home for golden monkeys, a variety of birds, reptiles, amphibians, and insects among other creatures which together make a complete Rwanda safari package.  Volcanoes National Park is named after the chain of dormant volcanoes making up the Virunga Massif; Bisoke with its verdant crater lake, Sabyinyo, Gahinga, Muhabura, and the highest at 4,507 meters, Karisimbi. 

Trekking at Volcanoes National Park typically lasts between four and eight hours, most of which is spent hiking through bamboo forests, meadows, and swampland. Guides from the national park service will eventually lead you to one of the habituated gorilla families. Visitors typically spend an hour observing the creatures as they eat, care for their babies, and interact with each another.

Nyungwe Forest National Park 
One of the oldest rainforests in Africa, Nyungwe, is spectacularly beautiful and rich in biodiversity with a total 1,068 plant species, including 140 orchid species, and also 322 species of birds including red-collared babbler, along with 75 mammalian species such as the serval cat, mongoose, congo clawless otter, and leopard to name a few. Most tourists come to this rainforest to track chimpanzees, as well as 12 other primate species, including the L’Hoest’s monkey endemic to the Albertine Rift. The park is also home to the only canopy walk in East Africa, with it being roughly a 90-minute hike from the Uwinka Visitor Center. Visitors walk across a 91-meter long suspension bridge dangling more than 50 meters above the verdant rainforest, getting a dizzying view of the treetops and mountains in the distance.

Gishwati Forest 
Gishwati Forest is part of Gishwati-Mukura Forest National Park. The Gishwati Concession is managed by Wilderness Safaris in collaboration with the Forest of Hope Association and Rwanda Development Board. Gishwati Forest was opened to the public on the 1st of December 2020. Most popular activities are Chimpanzee tracking, hiking and birding. The only accommodation in the park is the Forest of Hope Guest House which has two twin rooms and a campsite.

Akagera National Park 
A roughly two-and-a-half-hour drive from Kigali is Akagera National Park. Managed by the African Parks Organization, Akagera National Park is located in eastern Rwanda with 2500 km2 (one of Central Africa's largest protected wetlands) of mainly Savannah land. The park is named after the Kagera River that flows along Rwanda’s eastern boundary with Tanzania. The river feeds into Lake Ihema and other smaller lakes in and around the park. The park protects an African savanna landscape of acacia and bush with patches of open grassland and a dozen swampy lakes. It is home to elephants, buffalo, giraffe, zebras, leopards, hyenas, lions, and several antelopes like bushbucks, topis, oribis, water-buck, roan antelope, duiker, klipspringer, impala, and world largest antelope, the cape eland. Visitors can watch schools of hippos and Nile crocodiles basking in the sun near Lake Ihema. The common primates in Akagera national park are olive baboons, vervet monkeys, blue monkeys, and bush babies. Visitors can also see the environment make a shift from savanna plains, to wetlands, and to lakes.

Lake Kivu 
Covering a surface area of 2,700 km2, Lake Kivu is Rwanda’s largest lake and the sixth largest in Africa. Steep, terraced hills lead down to the picturesque lake shore and the resort towns of Gisenyi, Kibuye, and Cyangugu. These small towns serve as retreats from the sometimes strenuous hikes to find gorillas and chimpanzees in the surrounding Volcanoes and Nyungwe Forest National Parks. Lake Kivu has a lively waterfront of sandy beaches mixed with resorts. Lake Kivu is also known as one of the safest lakes in Africa and there are no dangerous animals such as hippos or crocodiles. Lake Kivu also has hundreds of islands. The most known island in Lake Kivu is Napoleon Island outside Karongi which is a conservation area and home to one of Africa's largest colonies of straw colored fruit bats. Most common way to explore Lake Kivu is through one of the standard tour boats with benches and a roof. More adventurous ways visitors explore Rwanda are through kayaking tours on Lake Kivu,

Congo Nile Trail 
The Congo Nile Trail is a hiking and mountain biking trail along the Congo Nile Divide between Rusizi and Rubavu., The Congo Nile Trail has 8 biking stages and 10 hiking stages. Each stage takes one day to complete and there is food and accommodation at the end of each stage. The Congo Nile Trail passes through the wonderful scenery of Lake Kivu and the green Rwandan hills. The trail passes through 5 towns, Rubavu, Rutsiro, Karongi, Nyamasheke and Rusizi. The Congo Nile Trail also passes by 2 of Rwanda's 5 national parks; Nyungwe Forest National Park and Gishwati-Mukura Forest National Park

King's Palace Museum 
The star attraction at King's Palace Museum, which is one of Rwanda’s eight national museums, is the sacred inyambo cows due to their staggeringly large horns. Throughout the day traditional singers lull the cows into a mellow state by belting poems, which is a ritual unique to Rwanda.

The museum showcases a replica of a king's palace from the 15th century with a thatched roof, royal hut, and a fresh milk hut traditionally run by an unmarried woman.

Tourists can also explore the colonial-style home that was once the royal residence of King Mutara III Rudahigwa in the mid 20th century. The interior design strikingly blends Rwandan patterns with European-style furniture (some of which were actually owned by the king).

Ethnographic Museum 
One of Africa's best collections of ethnological and archeological artifacts can be found in Rwanda's ethnographic museum, located about 130 kilometers south of Kigali in the Huye District. Belgium gifted the museum to the city in 1989 in honor of the 25th anniversary of Rwandan independence.

The ethnographic museum's seven galleries take visitors back in time to pre-colonial Rwanda. The galleries hold a collection of woven baskets, traditional garments made from animal hides, woven grass spears and bows, musical drums from hundreds of years ago, and old farming tools.

Visitors can step inside an authentic royal home and learn how it was constructed. The museum also hosts live handicraft demonstrations.

Kigali Genocide Memorial 
Inaugurated on the 10th anniversary of the Rwandan Genocide, the Kigali Genocide Memorial at Gisozi is where 250,000 victims have been buried. This memorial serves to educate how the genocide against the Tutsi took shape, and in addition, it also examines other genocides that took place during the 20th century.

The wall of names is dedicated to those who died, though many of the victims of the genocide are unknown and names have yet to be found, so it is still a work in progress.

The memorial gardens provide a place for quiet contemplation about the history of the genocide against the Tutsi. While the largest memorial is in Kigali, the genocide touched all corners of Rwanda, and as such there are many emotionally charged memorials located throughout the country. Some areas are simple as a quiet garden space for contemplation, while others are larger and hold relics, remains, and exhibits on the genocide itself.

See also 

 Lake Muhazi
 Twin lakes of Burera and Ruhondo
 Ibyiwacu Cultural Village 
 Mount Bisoke
 Kandt House Museum

References

External links

 Rwanda Development Board/Tourism and Conservation Department
Kivu Belt Destination Management Unit 

 
Rwanda